Oxley College can refer to either one of two schools in Australia:

Oxley College (Burradoo), in New South Wales
Oxley College (Chirnside Park), in Victoria